Qumayra (Arabic: قميرا) is a locality in Dhank Province, Ad Dhahirah Governorate, Oman. Qumayra has two mosques, a school, a community center and 49 other buildings. Qumayra also has four roads, one connecting Qumayra to the main highway system and one cul-de-sac leading into the Al Hajar Mountains. Qumayra has a nearby mountain with the same name called Lujmat Qumayrā.
Alternative names for Qumayra are Qumayrah, Qumayrā, Qymra.

Qumayra has a BWh hot desert climate.

Qumayra's region also has architecturally unique tombs and stone formations from the early bronze age.

Demographics 
Qumayra's population has increased from 303 in 2003 to 311 in 2010 to 387 in 2020. Qumayra's population structure is made up of 214 males and 173 females (55.3% to 44.7%), 100 people aged under 14, 274 between 15 and 64 and 13 over 65 (25.8% to 70.8% to 3.4%). 342 people in Qumayra are of Omani ethnicity and 45 are not. The table below is the age structure of Qumayra's population.

References 

Ad Dhahirah Governorate